Seven ships of the Royal Navy have borne the name HMS Sheerness, after the town of Sheerness in Kent, once home to one of the navy's dockyards:

  was a 2-gun smack launched in 1673 and sunk as a foundation in 1695.
  was a 32-gun fifth rate launched in 1691, rebuilt in 1731 and sold in 1744.
  was a 24-gun sixth rate launched in 1743 and sold in 1768.
  was a store lighter launched in 1759 and broken up in 1811.
  was a 44-gun fifth rate launched in 1787 and wrecked in 1805. Because Sheerness served in the navy's Egyptian campaign (8 March to 2 September 1801), her officers and crew qualified for the clasp "Egypt" to the Naval General Service Medal, which the Admiralty issued in 1847 to all surviving claimants.
  was a 4-gun tender launched in 1788 and broken up in 1811.
  was a 10-gun tender purchased in 1791 and probably sold in 1810.

Sources

References

Royal Navy ship names